Johnny Davis Jr. (born December 5, 1989) is an American professional wrestler, better known by his ring name J. T. Dunn. 

Since debuting in December 2009, Dunn has worked extensively across the United States for promotions such as All Elite Wrestling WWE, Impact Wrestling, Combat Zone Wrestling (CZW), Beyond Wrestling, XWA, Chaotic Wrestling (CW), and Pro Wrestling Guerrilla (PWG), and has also wrestled in Europe for Westside Xtreme Wrestling (wXw). Currently the owner of CHAOTIC WRESTLING (storyline only) when he beat Kevin Bowe for control of the company at final fight)

Early life

Davis was born in Cranston, Rhode Island, and played football extensively throughout his childhood. After graduating from high school at 16, he received scholarships from a number of different schools to play football. Off of the field, Davis began developing a heavy addiction to alcohol and pain medications, and was eventually involved in a drunk driving accident with a friend. Both Davis and his friend were luckily unharmed. Soon after the drunk-driving incident, Davis' mother died, and he subsequently began abusing drugs as well as alcohol. His father, whom Dunn has said he has a poor relationship with, soon kicked him out of the house they lived in together, and Davis has said in the past that he "basically lived on the streets of Providence before staying with friends leading to him getting back on his feet."

Professional wrestling career

Beyond Wrestling (2011–present) 

Dunn debuted for Beyond Wrestling in June 2011, defeating Stan Stylez in his first match with the promotion. He then won a newcomers 10 Person Gaunlet, defeating Joey Janela in the finals. The following day, he lost to Aaron Epic in a fatal four-way match, also featuring Dan Barry and Jarek 1-20. On July 23 at About Time, Dunn lost to Leon St. Giovanni. Dunn would go on to become a Star in Beyond, competing with the promotion on a regular basis throughout 2013 through 2017. In March 2014, Dunn faced his idol Chris Hero in a highly acclaimed match that ended in a double knockout. In July, Dunn and longtime partner David Starr faced The Young Bucks in another highly praised match. In November, Dunn and Starr took part in Beyond's Tournament for Tomorrow as The Juicy Product, defeating The Osirian Portal (Amasis and Ophidian) in the first round, but losing to Team Tremendous (Dan Barry and Bill Carr) in the semi-finals. After The Juicy Product split in late 2014, in March 2015, Dunn began teaming with Chris Hero as the popular Death by Elbow tag team. In their first match together, Hero and Dunn defeated Dunn's former partner David Starr and Eddie Kingston. At Beyond Scorned on April 25, Dunn defeated Starr in a singles match. On May 31 at The Real Thing, Death by Elbow defeated Team Tremendous, and defeated Da Hoodz (Davey Cash and Kris Pyro) in June. The following month at Beyond Americanrana, they defeated The Young Bucks in another highly acclaimed match. On December 27, Dunn once again lost to Hero in singles action. On January 31, 2016, Dunn defeated Joey Janela in a steel cage match, but lost to Janela in a dog collar match on February 28. On December 29, Dunn and Hero lost to The American Destroyers (Donovan Dijak and Mikey Webb) in what would go on to become their last match together as Hero would re-sign with WWE in January 2017.

Total Nonstop Action Wrestling (2016) 
Dunn made a one-off appearance for Total Nonstop Action Wrestling (TNA) in July 2016, losing to Braxton Sutter.

Combat Zone Wrestling (2013–2015) 

Dunn debuted with CZW in 2013, and soon after formed a tag team with David Starr collectively known as "The Juicy Product" (combining Dunn's nickname of "The Juice" and Starr's nickname of "The Product"). In their first match as a tag team, Starr and Dunn lost to 4-Loco (Azrieal and Bandido Jr.) at Down With The Sickness. At Cerebral in October, they won their first match as a team, defeating Caleb Konley and Shane Hollister at Cerebral. On November 2 at Night Of Infamy, Starr, along with Andrew Everett, Caleb Konley and Latin Dragon, took part in a 5 Way Scramble match to determine the new #1 contender for the CZW Wired Television Championship, won by Shane Strickland. On December 14 at Cage Of Death XV, Starr and Dunn unsuccessfully challenged Blk Out (Ruckus and Blk Jeez) for the CZW World Tag Team Championship. On January 11, 2014 at Answering The Challenge, Starr and Dunn were defeated by OI4K (Jake and Dave Crist). At CZW's 15th Anniversary Show on February 8, The Juicy Product faced OI4K, The Nation Of Intoxication (Danny Havoc and Lucky 13) and The Front (Ace Delic and Sozio) in a 4-way match, won by The Front. At High Stakes 5, Dunn and Starr teamed up with Biff Busick and Alex Colon in a loss to OI4K, Azrieal and Chris Dickinson. On April 12 at Best of the Best XIII, Dunn and Starr became the new #1 contenders to the CZW Tag Team Championship, defeating OI4K. On April 27 at To Infinity, Starr and Dunn defeated The Beaver Boys (John Silver and Alex Reynolds) to become the new CZW World Tag Team Champions. They made their first successful defence at Proving Grounds on May 10, defeating Silver and Reynolds in a rematch. They once again successfully defended the championships on May 31, defeating Los Ben Dejos (Jay Cruz and Jay Rios)., and on June 14 at Tournament Of Death 13, they retained the championships once again, this time against Drew Gulak and Sozio. The Juicy Product made a surprise appearance for CZW's sister all-female promotion Women Superstars Uncensored (WSU) later that month, defeating Annie Social and Kimber Lee in 10 seconds to win the WSU Tag Team Championship. Back in CZW, they again retained the CZW Tag Team Championship at New Heights on July 12 in a fatal four-way match, defeating The Beaver Boys, OI4K and Team Tremendous (Dan Barry and Bill Carr). On September 13 at WSU Resurgence, they successfully defended the WSU Tag Team Championships in a rematch against Lee and Social, and later that night retained the CZW Tag Team Championship against OI4K and The Beaver Boys in a 3-way ladder match at Down With The Sickness. On September 27 at Deja Vu, Starr and Dunn lost the CZW Tag Team Championships to OI4K. At WSU's 8th Anniversary Show on February 21, 2015, Dunn and Starr were defeated by Lee and Social for the WSU Tag Team Championship. On October 10, 2015 at Tangled Web 8, Dunn defeated former tag team partner David Starr. On October 14, 2017 at The Wolf Of Wrestling, Dunn (now being accompanied by Josh Briggs) returned to CZW and defeated Space Monkey, John Silver, and Trey Miguel in a fatal-four-way match. He then went on to defeat Ace Romero at Night Of Infamy after an assist from Briggs.

Westside Xtreme Wrestling (2016) 

Dunn debuted for German promotion Westside Xtreme Wrestling (wXw) in September 2016, losing to Walter. From September 30 to October 2, Dunn and Hero participated in the wXw World Tag Team League as Death by Elbow in the B Block. They won two of their matches, defeating Cerberus (Ilja Dragunov and Julian Nero) and the LDRS of the New School (Zack Sabre Jr. and Marty Scurll), but losing to A4 (Absolute Andy and Marius Al-Awani). They finished the tournament with 2 wins and 4 points and did not advance to the final.

Pro Wrestling Guerrilla (2016) 

Dunn debuted in PWG as part of Death by Elbow at All Star Weekend 12 in a losing effort to the team of Ricochet and Matt Sydal. Later at Thirteen, the team unsuccessfully challenged The Young Bucks for the PWG World Tag Team Championship. Dunn returned to PWG in December, teaming with Hero and losing to reDRagon (Kyle O'Reilly and Bobby Fish).

Personal life 

In 2007 after Davis enrolled in wrestling training, he suffered a severe facial injury after an opponent performed a chokeslam incorrectly and dropped Davis on his head, causing his right knee to hit the right side of his face and fracture almost everything on that side of his face. Davis has said that he has no recollection of who performed the move and didn't actually feel any pain because his orbital bone broke away and pinched a nerve connected to his brain, causing temporary facial paralysis. Davis had facial reconstructive surgery and a metal plate placed in the right side of his face. Davis has spoken openly about his addiction to drugs and alcohol in the past, saying that he was addicted to both from high school until May 19, 2012, when he woke up in his apartment after binging on both drugs and alcohol that a promoter had given him as payment for wrestling with no recollection of how he got there. Soon after, he quit both and has remained sober ever since. He uses the ring name Dunn as a tribute to his late mother's maiden name.

Championships and accomplishments 
Beyond Wrestling
Tournament For Tomorrow II (2013)
Chaotic Wrestling
Chaotic Wrestling Heavyweight Championship (3 times)
Chaotic Wrestling Tag Team Championship (2 times) – with Davienne (1) and Ace Romero, Alisha, Danny Miles, Mike Verna and Trigga The OG (1)
Combat Zone Wrestling
CZW World Tag Team Championship (1 time) - with David Starr
Dreamwave Wrestling
Dreamwave Alternative Championship (1 time)
Full Impact Pro
FIP World Tag Team Championship (1 time) - with David Starr
Five Borough Wrestling
FBW Heavyweight Championship (1 time)
Limitless Wrestling
Vacationland Cup (2018)
New England Frontier Wrestling
NEFW United States Championship (1 time)
New York Wrestling Connection
NYWC Tag Team Championship (1 time) - with David Starr
Northeast Wrestling
NEW Heavyweight Championship (1 time)
NEW Live Championship (1 time)
King Of Bethany (2019)
Northeast Championship Wrestling
NCW Heavyweight Championship (2 times)
NCW New England Championship (1 time)
Power League Wrestling
PLW World Championship (1 time)
Premier Wrestling Federation Northeast
PWF Northeast Lightning Cup Championship (1 time)
 Pro Wrestling Illustrated
 PWI ranked him No. 218 of the top 500 singles wrestlers in the PWI 500 in 2018
Pro Wrestling Magic
PWM Championship (1 time)
Revival Pro Wrestling
RPW United States Championship (1 time)
The Wrestling Revolver
REVOLVER Championship (2 time)
Women Superstars Uncensored
WSU Tag Team Championship (1 time) - with David Starr
Xtreme Wrestling Alliance
XWA Heavyweight Championship (1 time)
XWA Tag Team Championship (1 time) - with Ace Romero and Anthony Greene
Xtreme Rumble Winner (2016)

References

External links
 
 
 

1989 births
Living people
American male professional wrestlers
Professional wrestlers from Rhode Island